Pierre-Luc Brillant (born January 29, 1978) is a Canadian actor and musician. He is best known for his performance in the film C.R.A.Z.Y., for which he received a Prix Jutra nomination for Best Supporting Actor in 2006.

Brillant is also a musician and songwriter. He has recorded two albums as a duo with his spouse, actress and singer Isabelle Blais.

Selected filmography
 The Clean Machine (Tirelire Combines & Cie) - 1992
 Matusalem II - 1997
 Memories Unlocked (Souvenirs intimes) - 1999
 Life After Love (La vie après l'amour) - 2000
 C.R.A.Z.Y. - 2005
 On the Trail of Igor Rizzi (Sur la trace d'Igor Rizzi) - 2006
 Deliver Me (Délivrez-moi) - 2006
 My Daughter, My Angel (Ma fille, mon ange) - 2007
 Borderline - 2008
 Everything Is Fine (Tout est parfait) - 2008
 The Kate Logan Affair - 2010
 La Run - 2011
 Fear of Water (La Peur de l'eau) - 2011
 Small Blind (La mise à l'aveugle) - 2012
 The Fireflies Are Gone (La disparition des lucioles) - 2018
 The Nest (Le nid) - 2018

References

External links

1978 births
Living people
20th-century Canadian male actors
21st-century Canadian male actors
Canadian male film actors
Canadian male television actors
Canadian male stage actors
Canadian songwriters
Université du Québec à Montréal alumni